Sky Princess is a Royal-class cruise ship currently operated by Princess Cruises, a subsidiary of Carnival Corporation & plc. She is the second ship in the cruise line's history to sail under this name. She is the fourth Royal-class ship in the Princess fleet and commenced operations in October 2019. The ship measures 145,281 GT and has a capacity of 3,660 passengers.

History

Planning and construction 
Carnival Corporation first entered a strategic agreement with Fincantieri in March 2015 for five cruise ships for delivery between 2019 and 2022. From this agreement, the order for a then-unnamed, fourth Royal-class vessel was announced for Princess on 30 December 2015. The contract for this order was finalized on 2 April 2016. On 30 November 2017, Princess Cruises officially announced the name of the fourth Royal-class ship as Sky Princess, in honor of a previous Princess vessel that carried the same name.

Construction began on 9 November 2016 with the steel cutting for the ship's bow at Fincantieri's shipyard in Castellammare di Stabia, with a separate milestone on 8 September 2017 marking the steel-cutting for the rest of the ship at Fincantieri's shipyard in Monfalcone. Her keel-laying was performed on 5 July 2018. She was floated out on 14 February 2019 and completed her sea trials in September 2019.

Debut 
Sky Princess was officially delivered on 15 October 2019 in her handover ceremony at Fincantieri's shipyard in Monfalcone.

The ship sailed a four-day pre-inaugural "shakedown" cruise for the press on 16 October 2019 from Trieste to Athens with a call in Kotor. She performed her official maiden voyage on 20 October 2019, a seven-day cruise sailing between Athens and Barcelona. She sailed a short inaugural season in the Mediterranean in fall 2019 before repositioning to her new homeport of Port Everglades in Fort Lauderdale, Florida, arriving on 1 December 2019. Due to high demand, two three-day inaugural cruises were scheduled on 1 December 2019 and 4 December 2019, with both cruising between Port Everglades and Princess Cays.

Sky Princess was christened at Port Everglades on 7 December 2019 by NASA astronaut and U.S. Navy Captain Kay Hire and NASA engineer Poppy Northcutt.

Operational career 
During the winter months, Sky Princess sails in the Caribbean from Port Everglades. For the summer months, she sails in Europe, including the Baltic region. In the fall, she sails along the Maritimes and New England from New York.

Design and specifications 
Main propulsion is via two propellers, each driven by a  electric motor. The ship houses 1,830 passenger cabins and 757 crew cabins. Of the 1,830 passenger cabins, 81% have a balcony. The ship has a maximum capacity of 5,800 passengers and crew.

References 

 

Ships of Princess Cruises
2019 ships
Ships built in Monfalcone
Ships built by Fincantieri